Brian Blechen (born September 30, 1991) is a former American football linebacker. He played college football at the University of Utah.

Professional career

Carolina Panthers
On May 8, 2015, Blechen was signed as an undrafted free agent by the Carolina Panthers. On September 5, 2015, he was released by the Panthers. On September 7, 2015, Blechen was signed to the Panthers' practice squad. On September 22, 2015, he was released from practice squad. On December 1, 2015, he was re-signed to practice squad. On February 7, 2016, Blechen's Panthers played in Super Bowl 50. In the game, the Panthers fell to the Denver Broncos by a score of 24–10. On February 9, 2016. Blechen signed a futures contract with the Carolina Panthers.

On September 3, 2016, Blechen was waived by the Panthers as part of final roster cuts. The next day, he was signed to the Panthers' practice squad. He was released by the Panthers on November 3, 2016.

New Orleans Saints
On December 28, 2016, Blechen was signed to the Saints' practice squad.

Carolina Panthers (second stint)
On January 4, 2017, Blechen signed a reserve/future contract with the Panthers. On June 13, 2017, he was waived by the Panthers.

References

1991 births
Living people
Players of American football from California
American football linebackers
Utah Utes football players
Carolina Panthers players
People from Moorpark, California
New Orleans Saints players
Sportspeople from Ventura County, California